The Three Princes was a name given to Princes Boun Oum, Souvanna Phouma and Souphanouvong who represented respectively the royalist, neutralist and communist factions in the Kingdom of Laos in the post-WWII period.  The trio were named by King Sisavang Vatthana to form a coalition government following the independence of Laos.

Background and Representatives
The Three Princes represented three different political views held during the Laotian Civil War. The Laotian Civil War (1959–75) was fought between the Communist Pathet Lao (including many North Vietnamese of Lao ancestry) and the Royal Lao Government, with both sides receiving heavy external support in a proxy war between the global Cold War superpowers. It is called the Secret War among the CIA Special Activities Division and Hmong veterans of the conflict.

Prince Boun Oum Na Champasak
Prince Boun Oum (also Prince Boun Oum Na Champassak (December 12, 1911 – March 17, 1980) was the son of King Ratsadanay, and was the hereditary prince of Champassak and also Prime Minister of the Kingdom of Laos from 1948–1950 and again in 1960–1962. The right-wing Prince, cousin to the other two princes, overthrew the Phouma Government in 1960 which was supported by Lao leaders Phoui Sananikone and General Phoumi Nosavan, and the Hmong leader General Vang Pao.

Prince Souvanna Phouma
Prince Souvanna Phouma (7 October 1901 – 10 January 1984) was the leader of the neutralist faction and Prime Minister of the Kingdom of Laos several times (1951–1954, 1956–1958, 1960, and 1962–1975). The Prince was supported by Kong Le and the Royal Lao Government.

Prince Souphanouvong
Prince Souphanouvong (13 July 1909 – 9 January 1995) unlike his half-brothers, Souvanna Phouma and Phetsarath Ratanavongsa, whose mothers were of royal birth, his mother was a commoner, Mom Kham Ouane. He was the figurehead President of Laos from December 1975 to August 1991. A staunch communist and the leader of the Pathet Lao, was supported by Kaysone Phomvihane (later Prime Minister and President of the LPDR) and the North Vietnamese. By 1972, the Pathet Lao found it unacceptable to form a coalition with rightist members, mostly military generals and the rich and powerful Na Champassak and Sananikone families.

Supporters of the Princes

References

Trios
Laotian princes